São Martinho do Bispo e Ribeira de Frades (officially União das Freguesias de São Martinho do Bispo e Ribeira de Frades) is a civil parish in the municipality of Coimbra, Portugal. The population in 2021 was 15,322, in an area of 24.68 km2. It was the result of two freguesias joining on 28 January 2013; São Martinho do Bispo and Ribeira de Frades.

References
Citations

Freguesias of Coimbra